TGK may refer to:

 Keratinocyte transglutaminase, an enzyme
 Chemical oxygen generator
 Tongkang LRT station (LRT station abbreviation), Sengkang, Singapore